Phiwa Nkambule (born 24 January 1992) is a technology entrepreneur, technology businessperson and internet activist best known for co-founding Riovic and leading it as its CEO. He previously founded Cybatar and sat on the board of the Royal Science and Technology Park.

Early life
Phiwa Nkambule was born in Manzini where he also spent his childhood.

In 2006, as a 14-year-old, he began fixing and building computers with his uncle in a small township in Eswatini. Nkambule moved to South Africa in 2007 for academic purposes. Phiwa was a law student at the University of Pretoria before quitting to start his first technology company Cybatar from his garage in 2014. It was at the university where he taught himself web and app development.

Entrepreneurship

Before leaving the University of Pretoria Phiwa attempted to work with the Swaziland National Library and the Manzini Regional Education Office in 2013 but was rejected. After dropping out of university in 2014 Nkambule founded Cybatar, a technology company focused on fuel delivery from his garage in Pretoria, South Africa.

In 2015 Nkambule co-founded Riovic, an insurance technology company. The company owns and operates online platforms that connect consumers with insurance, credit and investments.

In May 2019 Princess Sikhanyiso, the eldest daughter of King Mswati III of Eswatini and the Eswatini Minister of Information, Communication and Technology appointed Phiwa to the board of the Royal Science and Technology Park, a state-owned enterprise created to foster the conception of inventions and facilitate their patenting and help knit various elements of the R&D cluster together.

Politics
In September 2021 Phiwa Nkambule discovered that he had been removed from the board of the Royal Science and Technology Park through the company's website without any official communication following his public support for the unbanning of political parties after the political unrest that took place in June 2021 in Eswatini. The Ministry of Information, Communication and Technology claimed that his 3-year term which started in May 2019 had lapsed.

Philanthropy
On 24 October 2015, he released the first tuition crowdfunding platform in South Africa in the wake of the FeesMustFall protests that saw the country's tertiary institutions shut down to help save students from tuition debt. He also launched a free online learning platform for digital skills aimed at reducing the youth unemployment rate in South Africa.

Awards and recognition

Phiwa Nkambule was invited to deliver a keynote address on Digital Technologies in Insurance at the 13th International Microinsurance Conference in Peru, South America in November 2017.

In June 2018, he was named in the Forbes Africa 30 Under 30 list of most promising entrepreneurs in the technology category. In October 2018 he was named in Destiny Man’s Power of 40 list, a list of 40 trailblazers under the age of 40.

In September 2020 Nkambule was one of the entrepreneurs named in a book titled "Entrepreneurs Who Changed History" published by Dorling Kindersley, profiling more than 90 leaders of industry across the world and throughout the ages – from the enterprising bankers of the medieval world and the merchants of empire, to the titans of industry and the geniuses of Silicon Valley.

In December 2021, Phiwa was named Social Media Personality of the Year by the Times of Swaziland. He was recognized as an influential and well-loved persona on the internet for being vocal and eloquent about the political unrest in Eswatini through his verified Twitter account by the national publication.

See also 
 Riovic
 Cybatar
 Royal Science and Technology Park

References

External links
 
 
 

South African businesspeople
Swazi businesspeople
21st-century South African businesspeople
Businesspeople in software
Businesspeople in information technology
Businesspeople in insurance
African computer businesspeople
Financial company founders
South African business executives
South African chief executives
South African company founders
South African computer programmers
South African corporate directors
South African engineers
Swazi chief executives
1992 births
Living people
University of Pretoria alumni
Technology company founders
Internet company founders
Chief executives in the technology industry